Lone Elm is an unincorporated community in Cooper County, in the U.S. state of Missouri. The community is located at the intersection of Missouri routes KK and B approximately eleven miles south of Boonville.

History
A post office called Lone Elm was established in 1868, and remained in operation until 1906. The community was named for a large individual elm tree near the original town site.

References

Unincorporated communities in Cooper County, Missouri
Unincorporated communities in Missouri